The We're Not Invisible Tour was the third headlining tour by American country musician Hunter Hayes. The tour was opened by Dan + Shay and Danielle Bradbery. The tour began on March 20, 2014, in Pikeville, Kentucky and ended on May 31, 2014, in Estero, Florida.

Setlist
"Somebody's Heartbreak"
"More Than I Should"
"Love Makes Me"
"Everybody's Got Somebody but Me"
"In a Song"
"If You Told Me To"
"What You Gonna Do"
"Endless Summer"
"Faith to Fall Back On"
"Counting Stars" (OneRepublic cover)
"Wanted"
"Light Me Up"
"Better Than This"
"Invisible"
Encore
"I Want Crazy"

Tour dates

References

2014 concert tours
Hunter Hayes concert tours